The Mystic Flower is a c. 1890 religious oil on canvas painting by Gustave Moreau, inspired by Carpaccio's Apotheosis of Saint Ursula, which Moreau was able to copy during his stay in Venice. At 2.53 metres tall, this original work closed Moreau's Cycle of Man by showing the importance of sacrifice by heroic figures.

History
Moreau painted the work at the end of his life, when he was reflecting on his works' future. He thus began editing the accounts of his works and creating canvases on a museum format such as The Mystic Flower. It was also an era when Moreau produced more and more vertically symmetrical compositions such as Christ The Redeemer.''

References

Bibliography
 
 
 
 
 
 
 
 
 
 

1890 paintings
Paintings by Gustave Moreau
Oil paintings of the Musée Gustave-Moreau
Religious paintings